The Second League of the Republika Srpska is a third level football league competition in Bosnia and Herzegovina. It is divided into two leagues, based on geographical areas. The winner of each league is promoted to the First League of the Republika Srpska. Clubs at the bottom of the table are relegated to the respective regional leagues.

Member clubs for 2020–21

East (Istok)

 FK Bratstvo Bratunac
 FK Budućnost Pilica
 FK Drina HE Višegrad
 FK Famos Vojkovići
 FK Glasinac 2011
 FK Guber Srebrenica
 FK Ilićka 01 Brčko
 FK Jedinstvo Brodac
 FK Milići
 FK Mladost Gacko
 FK Mladost Rogatica
 FK Proleter Dvorovi
 FK Romanija Pale
 FK Stakorina Čajniče
 FK Velež Nevesinje
 FK Vlasenica

West (Zapad)

 FK Borac Šamac
 OFK Brdo Hambarine
 FK Čelinac
 FK Dubrave
 FK Jedinstvo Žeravica
 FK Laktaši
 FK Mladost Donja Slatina
 FK Omarska
 FK Polet 1926
 FK Progres Kneževo
 FK Proleter Teslić
 FK Sloboda Mrkonjić Grad
 FK Sloga Srbac
 FK Sloga Trn

External links
Football Association of Republika Srpska 

 
3
2